Evangelical Lutheran Church in Oldenburg is a Lutheran church in the German state of Lower Saxony.

The seat of the church leaders is in Oldenburg, as is the preaching venue of its bishop at St Lamberti Church. The Evangelical Lutheran Church in Oldenburg is a regional church (German: Landeskirche) and a full member of the Evangelical Church in Germany (EKD). As one of just two regional churches in the EKD, the church is only a guest member of the United Evangelical Lutheran Church of Germany (VELKD) and the Union of Evangelical Churches (UEK). The church is also a full member of the Community of Protestant Churches in Europe and the Lutheran World Federation. The church has 390,072 members (2020) in 123 parishes, with approximately 260 pastors (men and women). It is the largest Protestant denomination in the area of the former state of Oldenburg.

History 
The Lutheran Reformation came to the County of Oldenburg beginning in 1527. Until the German Revolution in 1918, the church was a state church and the monarch was the acting bishop (summus episcopus, or supreme governor) of the church. In 1922 the Church in Oldenburg counted 291,000 parishioners.

Practices 
Ordination of women and blessing of same-sex marriages were allowed.

Leadership of the church 
The Evangelical Lutheran Church in Oldenburg has four leading authorities: the synod, the bishop, the superior church council (Oberkirchenrat), and the common church committee.

Synod 
The synod is the highest leading authority in the Church. The election of the 60 members (two-thirds laypersons and one-third clerics) of the synod is for six years.

Leading persons and bishops in history 

1893–1904: Martin Bernhard Schomann, president
1904–1920: Eugen von Finckh, president
1920–1934: Heinrich Tilemann, president
1934–1944: Johannes Volkers, bishop
1945–1952: Wilhelm Stählin, bishop
1952−1953: bishop crisis: Wilhelm Hahn was elected, but not inaugurated.
1954–1967: Gerhard Jacobi, bishop
1967–1985: Hans-Heinrich Harms, bishop
1985–1998: Wilhelm Sievers, bishop
1998–2008: Peter Krug, bishop
2008−2018: Jan Janssen, bishop
2018-today: Thomas Adomeit, bishop

External links 
 http://www.kirche-oldenburg.de (Evangelical Lutheran Church in Oldenburg)

Notes 

Oldenburg
Oldenburg Land
Oldenburg
Oldenburg
Oldenburg
Oldenburg
Oldenburg
Oldenburg
Oldenburg